{{DISPLAYTITLE:C7H7NO2}}
The molecular formula C7H7NO2 (molar mass: 137.14 g/mol) may refer to:

 Aminobenzoic acids
 2-Aminobenzoic acid (o-aminobenzoic acid, anthranilic acid)
 3-Aminobenzoic acid (m-aminobenzoic acid)
 4-Aminobenzoic acid (p-aminobenzoic acid, PABA)
 Mononitrotoluenes
 2-Nitrotoluene
 3-Nitrotoluene
 4-Nitrotoluene
 Salicylaldoxime
 Salicylamide
 Trigonelline
 Alpha-Nitrotoluene or (Nitromethyl)benzene

Molecular formulas